, Southwest Airlines has scheduled flights to over 100 destinations in 42 states, Puerto Rico, Mexico, Central America and the Caribbean, the newest being Syracuse, New York on November 14, 2021. The airline has 15 focus cities and operates over 4,000 flights each day.

Destinations
Southwest does not use the "hub and spoke" system of other major airlines, preferring instead the "point-to-point" system with focus cities. It has large operations in certain airports. An average of 80 percent of Southwest passengers are local passengers—only 20 percent are connecting passengers, a lower percentage than on most major airlines, where many passengers connect in hub cities. However, at Southwest's focus cities, the percentage of connecting passengers can reach 30 percent. 
As part of its effort to control costs, Southwest historically used secondary airports in cities where the primary airports have high costs, such as Chicago, Dallas/Fort Worth, Houston and Miami. In recent years however, the airline has been expanding into primary airports as well. In most cities where Southwest uses both a primary and secondary airport, the secondary airport is used more than the primary for flights (such as Oakland instead of San Francisco), with some exceptions such as the Los Angeles metro area, where Los Angeles International is a Southwest base and secondary airports (such as Burbank, Long Beach, Santa Ana and Ontario) have limited Southwest operations despite having a higher market share at the smaller airports.

Unlike most other U.S. airlines, it does not fly outside the continent of North America (except to Hawaii), and it does not fly to Canada due to its payment system not being set up for Canadian dollars (however, Southwest does market Bellingham to cater to Canadian passengers in the Vancouver and Southern BC area as a low cost alternative to Vancouver International Airport).

International service
Southwest began planning international service when it acquired AirTran Airways, which already served international destinations. Southwest's first approach to international service came on April 19, 2012, when it signed a contract with the Amadeus IT Group to launch an international reservation system. This agreement gave the airline the capability to begin flying to destinations outside of the United States.

Southwest debuted the international reservation system on January 27, 2014, when its first international flights went on sale. This was followed by the first international flights which began on July 1, 2014, to Aruba (AUA), Montego Bay, Jamaica (MBJ) and Nassau, Bahamas (NAS).

Southwest built a 5-gate international terminal at William P. Hobby Airport that opened in 2015. Southwest also built a 5-gate international terminal in Fort Lauderdale that opened in 2017. In 2021, a 5-gate extension of terminal A at Baltimore/Washington International Airport opened. Southwest is the sole occupant of Terminal A and it invested significantly in the creation of the extension.

Busiest airports
, there are 16 airports at which Southwest Airlines has

Current destinations
, Southwest Airlines flies to 121 destinations.

Terminated destinations

Notes:

References

External links 
 Southwest Airlines Route Map

Destinations
Lists of airline destinations